James Proctor may refer to:

 James Proctor (priest) (fl. 1572–1575), English priest
 James McPherson Proctor (1882–1953), United States federal judge
 James Proctor (footballer) (1892–?), English footballer
 Jim Proctor (born 1935), American baseball player
 James E. Proctor Jr. (1936–2015), American politician
 James D. Proctor (born 1957), American scholar and professor
 Jamie Proctor (born 1992), English footballer

See also 
 Proctor (surname)